David Lee Wright (born December 1, 1949) is a mathematics professor, barbershop arranger, and Associate Director of the Ambassadors of Harmony (AOH). He is a noted a cappella historian and arranger, especially in the barbershop style where in 12 of 18 years from 1999 to 2016, his arrangements resulted in chorus gold medals at the Barbershop Harmony Society (BHS) International Contest. Wright travels the world as a barbershop historian, coach, and mathematics lecturer.

Early life 
Wright grew up in Mattoon, Illinois, and currently lives in St. Louis, Missouri. He graduated from David Lipscomb University in Nashville then earned his Ph.D. in Mathematics at Columbia University in New York. He joined the faculty of Washington University in St. Louis in 1972. He is married to Sandi Wright, Sweet Adelines International Quartet Champion of 1978 and 1986 with Tetrachords and Ambiance.

Career 
Wright is retired from his position as a professor of Mathematics at Washington University in St. Louis, where he also served as Chair of the Mathematics Department for several years. His research of affine algebraic geometry and polynomial automorphisms has led to publications and invitations to speak at international mathematics conferences. He designed and teaches a university course in Mathematics and Music, and has directed seminars across the globe on that topic.

Barbershop harmony 
Wright is an arranger and composer of vocal music, where his work often integrates the close harmony barbershop style with jazz, gospel, contemporary a cappella and more. He is the Associate Director of the St. Charles Ambassadors of Harmony, an award-winning male chorus of 130 singers. He was inducted into the Barbershop Harmony Society Hall of Fame in 2008. He has arranged hundreds of songs in the barbershop style, including some co-arranged with Deke Sharon, and has earned four international chorus gold medals with the Ambassadors of Harmony.  As a quartet singer he has won three district championships. He has appeared on national radio and TV broadcasts, and has authored several articles on vocal harmony, as well as a textbook on mathematics and music.

References 

1949 births
Living people
American music arrangers
21st-century American mathematicians
Washington University in St. Louis faculty
Washington University in St. Louis mathematicians
Columbia Graduate School of Arts and Sciences alumni
Lipscomb University alumni
20th-century American mathematicians